Maciste's American Nephew (Italian: Maciste e il nipote d'America) is a 1924 Italian silent adventure film directed by Eleuterio Rodolfi and starring Bartolomeo Pagano, Diomira Jacobini and Alberto Collo. It was part of the long-running Maciste series of films.

Cast
 Bartolomeo Pagano as Maciste 
 Diomira Jacobini
 Alberto Collo
 Augusto Bandini
 Oreste Bilancia
 Mercedes Brignone
 Pauline Polaire

References

Bibliography 
 Roy Kinnard & Tony Crnkovich. Italian Sword and Sandal Films, 1908–1990. McFarland, 2017.

External links 
 

1924 films
Italian adventure films
Italian silent feature films
1920s Italian-language films
Films directed by Eleuterio Rodolfi
1924 adventure films
Maciste films
Italian black-and-white films
Silent adventure films
1920s Italian films